Douglas Walton (born John Douglas Duder; October 17, 1909 – November 15, 1961) was a Canadian-born American actor who worked in American films during the 1930s and 1940s.  He appeared in 60 films between 1931 and 1950.

Life and career
Born  in Toronto, Ontario, Canada, Walton began his acting career in the theatres of Chicago and New York City. Tall, blond and elegant, Walton played many aristocratic, intellectual or sophisticated English or European men in films such as The Count of Monte Cristo in 1934; The Bride of Frankenstein (1935), in which Walton memorably played the English poet Percy Bysshe Shelley in the film's prologue; the Clark Gable version of Mutiny on the Bounty (1935); and director John Ford's Mary of Scotland (1936) starring Katharine Hepburn, in which Walton gave his perhaps best performance as the effeminate and cowardly "Lord Darnley". Walton was also directed by Ford in 1934's The Lost Patrol, Bad Lands in 1939, and The Long Voyage Home (1940), starring John Wayne.

In 1939, Walton returned to New York to appear on Broadway in the comedy Billy Draws a Horse.

In the 1940s, Walton's parts were secondary characters or even uncredited roles in B-movies, or sometimes in high-profile films such as King Vidor's Northwest Passage (1940), starring Spencer Tracy, and The Picture of Dorian Gray (1945).  One sizable role was "Percival Priceless" in Dick Tracy vs. Cueball (1947). His final film was Three Came Home (1950).

Walton retired in 1950 and died eleven years later, in 1961, from a heart attack, at age 52.

Filmography

References
Notes

Bibliography
Curtis, James (1998). James Whale: A New World of Gods and Monsters. Boston, Faber and Faber. .

External links

 
 

1909 births
1961 deaths
Canadian male film actors
Canadian male stage actors
20th-century Canadian male actors
Canadian emigrants to the United States
Male actors from Toronto